Jiřina Kudličková, née Ptáčníková (born 20 May 1986) is a former Czech pole vaulter. She won the 2012 European Athletics Championships in Helsinki and the 2014 World Indoor Championships.

Biography
She is the daughter of the Czech sprinter František Ptáčník.

Ptáčníková achieved a personal best (indoor) of 4.70 metres in Donetsk in 2012. This was a Czech record.  She improved to 4.71 m in 2014, which was also a Czech record.

She also achieved outdoor personal best of 4.76 metres in Plzeň in September 2013.

Personal life
On 21 September 2012 she married the hurdler Petr Svoboda, however the couple divorced in 2014. In September 2020 Ptáčníková married pole vaulter Jan Kudlička.

International competitions

See also
 Czech Athletics Championships - Records
 Czech records in athletics

References

External links
 
 Jiřina Ptáčníková at CAS web site

1986 births
Living people
Sportspeople from Plzeň
Czech female pole vaulters
Olympic athletes of the Czech Republic
Athletes (track and field) at the 2012 Summer Olympics
Athletes (track and field) at the 2016 Summer Olympics
European Athletics Championships medalists
World Athletics Championships athletes for the Czech Republic
Universiade medalists in athletics (track and field)
Universiade gold medalists for the Czech Republic
Medalists at the 2009 Summer Universiade